The International Federation of Francophone Accountants (Federation Internationale des Experts-Comptables Francophone, or FIDEF) is an organization that promotes exchange and cooperation between accountants in the French-speaking community.
Currently, the association has brought together 52 Member Institutes from 37 countries, representing 100,000 accounting professionals.

Members

See also
IFAC Member Bodies and Associates

References

Francophone
Organisation internationale de la Francophonie